Ed Peasley (born c. 1935) is a former American football player and coach.  He served as the head football coach at Northern Arizona University from 1971 to 1974.

High school
Peasley attended Mendota Township High School in Mendota, Illinois.

College career
Peasley initially attended Compton Junior College, earning Little All-American honors at end and played in the Junior Rose Bowl in 1956.  Peasley was a letterman for the Washington Huskies at end from 1957 to 1959.

Coaching career
Peasley began his coaching career at Washington, coaching as an assistant from 1961 to 1965.  Peasley then coached at Stanford in a variety of roles from 1966 to 1970.  Northern Arizona University gave Peasley a head coaching role, where he served from 1971 to 1974, compiling a 
15–35 record.  After four losing seasons he was fired along, with four assistants, in November 1974.  Peasley joined The Hawaiians of the World Football League (WFL) as an assistant in 1975, the league's final season.  He served as a head football coach at Indio High School from 1976 to 1977.

Head coaching record

References

External links
 Sports Reference profile

Year of birth missing (living people)
1930s births
Living people
American football ends
Compton Tartars football players
Northern Arizona Lumberjacks football coaches
Stanford Cardinal football coaches
Washington Huskies football coaches
Washington Huskies football players
The Hawaiians coaches
High school football coaches in California
People from Mendota, Illinois
Players of American football from Illinois